SWW may refer to:

Places
 South West Wales, Wales, UK
 Avenger Field (IATA airport code: SWW; ICAO airport code: KSWW) in Sweetwater, Texas, USA

People
 Scott W. Williams (born 1943) U.S. mathematician
 Stephanie Winston Wolkoff, U.S. fashion executive

Organizations and companies
 Służba Wywiadu Wojskowego (founded 2006) Polish intelligence agency, see List of intelligence agencies of Poland
 Sitel (NYSE stock ticker: SWW) voicemail services company
 Shovkoviy Shlyah (IATA airline code: S8; ICAO airline code: SWW) of Ukraine, see List of airline codes (S)
 SUNWAY Intersun Havacilik Anonim Sirketi (ICAO airline code: SWW) of Sweden, see Sunways
 School Without Walls (Washington, D.C.), magnet school
 Studio Watts Workshop (founded 1963) in Watts, LA, California, USA

Other uses
 Sowa language (ISO 639 language code: sww)
 Second World War (WW2)

See also
 West southwest
 S2W
 SW2 (disambiguation)